Jol is a town situated in Bangana block of Una district of Himachal Pradesh.

Cities and towns in Una district